The 1983 Michigan Wolverines baseball team represented the University of Michigan in the 1983 NCAA Division I baseball season. The head coach was Bud Middaugh, serving his 4th year. The Wolverines finished the season in 3rd place in the 1983 College World Series.

Roster

Schedule 

! style="" | Regular Season
|- valign="top" 

|- align="center" bgcolor="#ccffcc"
| 1 || March 11 || at  || Unknown • Orlando, Florida || 13–3 || 1–0 || 0–0
|- align="center" bgcolor="#ccffcc"
| 2 || March 11 || at Central Florida || Unknown • Orlando, Florida || 13–4 || 2–0 || 0–0
|- align="center" bgcolor="#ccffcc"
| 3 || March 12 || vs  || Unknown • DeLand, Florida || 4–1 || 3–0 || 0–0
|- align="center" bgcolor="#ccffcc"
| 4 || March 12 || vs  || Unknown • DeLand, Florida || 6–2 || 4–0 || 0–0
|- align="center" bgcolor="#ccffcc"
| 5 || March 13 || vs Central Florida || Unknown • DeLand, Florida || 10–4 || 5–0 || 0–0
|- align="center" bgcolor="#ccffcc"
| 6 || March 13 || vs  || Unknown • DeLand, Florida || 7–6 || 6–0 || 0–0
|- align="center" bgcolor="#ccffcc"
| 7 || March 14 || vs  || Unknown • DeLand, Florida || 5–4 || 7–0 || 0–0
|- align="center" bgcolor="#ccffcc"
| 8 || March 17 || vs  || Unknown • Unknown || 6–2 || 8–0 || 0–0
|- align="center" bgcolor="#ccffcc"
| 9 || March 18 || vs Yale || Unknown • Unknown || 7–3 || 9–0 || 0–0
|- align="center" bgcolor="#ccffcc"
| 10 || March 18 || vs Virginia || Unknown • Unknown || 6–3 || 10–0 || 0–0
|- align="center" bgcolor="#ffcccc"
| 11 || March 18 || vs  || Unknown • Unknown || 6–10 || 10–1 || 0–0
|- align="center" bgcolor="#ccffcc"
| 12 || March 19 || vs Rollins || Unknown • Unknown || 6–5 || 11–1 || 0–0
|-

|- align="center" bgcolor="#ccffcc"
| 13 || April 1 || at  || Unknown • Oxford, Ohio || 7–5 || 12–1 || 0–0
|- align="center" bgcolor="#ccffcc"
| 14 || April 2 || at Miami (OH) || Unknown • Oxford, Ohio || 7–3 || 13–1 || 0–0
|- align="center" bgcolor="#ccffcc"
| 15 || April 5 ||  || Ray Fisher Stadium • Ann Arbor, Michigan || 3–2 || 14–1 || 0–0
|- align="center" bgcolor="#ccffcc"
| 16 || April 5 || Aquinas || Ray Fisher Stadium • Ann Arbor, Michigan || 10–4 || 15–1 || 0–0
|- align="center" bgcolor="#ccffcc"
| 17 || April 6 || vs  || Unknown • Unknown, Michigan || 3–2 || 16–1 || 0–0
|- align="center" bgcolor="#ccffcc"
| 18 || April 6 || vs Western Michigan || Unknown • Unknown, Michigan || 3–1 || 17–1 || 0–0
|- align="center" bgcolor="#ffcccc"
| 19 || April 9 || vs  || Unknown • Unknown, Michigan || 1–5 || 17–2 || 0–0
|- align="center" bgcolor="#ccffcc"
| 20 || April 12 || vs  || Unknown • Unknown, Michigan || 7–3 || 18–2 || 0–0
|- align="center" bgcolor="#ccffcc"
| 21 || April 13 || vs Western Michigan || Unknown • Unknown, Michigan || 6–2 || 19–2 || 0–0
|- align="center" bgcolor="#ffcccc"
| 22 || April 13 || vs Western Michigan || Unknown • Unknown, Michigan || 1–3 || 19–3 || 0–0
|- align="center" bgcolor="#ccffcc"
| 23 || April 16 ||  || Ray Fisher Stadium • Ann Arbor, Michigan || 8–1 || 20–3 || 1–0
|- align="center" bgcolor="#ccffcc"
| 24 || April 16 || Indiana || Ray Fisher Stadium • Ann Arbor, Michigan || 6–2 || 21–3 || 2–0
|- align="center" bgcolor="#ccffcc"
| 25 || April 18 || Indiana || Ray Fisher Stadium • Ann Arbor, Michigan || 1–0 || 22–3 || 3–0
|- align="center" bgcolor="#ffcccc"
| 26 || April 19 || vs  || Unknown • Unknown || 2–3 || 22–4 || 3–0
|- align="center" bgcolor="#ffcccc"
| 27 || April 19 || vs Toledo || Unknown • Unknown || 0–5 || 22–5 || 3–0
|- align="center" bgcolor="#ccffcc"
| 28 || April 21 || vs  || Unknown • Unknown || 7–1 || 23–5 || 3–0
|- align="center" bgcolor="#ccffcc"
| 29 || April 21 || vs Cleveland State || Unknown • Unknown || 9–0 || 24–5 || 3–0
|- align="center" bgcolor="#ccffcc"
| 30 || April 24 || vs  || Unknown • Unknown, Michigan || 11–4 || 25–5 || 3–0
|- align="center" bgcolor="#ccffcc"
| 31 || April 24 || vs Ferris State || Unknown • Unknown, Michigan || 19–1 || 26–5 || 3–0
|- align="center" bgcolor="#ccffcc"
| 32 || April 30 || at  || Trautman Field • Columbus, Ohio || 10–3 || 27–5 || 4–0
|- align="center" bgcolor="#ffcccc"
| 33 || April 30 || at Ohio State || Trautman Field • Columbus, Ohio || 0–1 || 27–6 || 4–1
|-

|- align="center" bgcolor="#ccffcc"
| 34 || May 1 || at Ohio State || Trautman Field • Columbus, Ohio || 11–2 || 28–6 || 5–1
|- align="center" bgcolor="#ccffcc"
| 35 || May 2 || at Ohio State || Trautman Field • Columbus, Ohio || 17–11 || 29–6 || 6–1
|- align="center" bgcolor="#ccffcc"
| 36 || May 5 ||  || Ray Fisher Stadium • Ann Arbor, Michigan || 7–0 || 30–6 || 6–1
|- align="center" bgcolor="#ccffcc"
| 37 || May 5 || Adrian || Ray Fisher Stadium • Ann Arbor, Michigan || 8–0 || 31–6 || 6–1
|- align="center" bgcolor="#ccffcc"
| 38 || May 7 || at  || John H. Kobs Field • East Lansing, Michigan || 11–9 || 32–6 || 7–1
|- align="center" bgcolor="#ccffcc"
| 39 || May 7 || at Michigan State || John H. Kobs Field • East Lansing, Michigan || 13–5 || 33–6 || 8–1
|- align="center" bgcolor="#ccffcc"
| 40 || May 8 || Michigan State || Ray Fisher Stadium • Ann Arbor, Michigan || 10–0 || 34–6 || 9–1
|- align="center" bgcolor="#ccffcc"
| 41 || May 8 || Michigan State || Ray Fisher Stadium • Ann Arbor, Michigan || 6–3 || 35–6 || 10–1
|- align="center" bgcolor="#ccffcc"
| 42 || May 10 || vs Wayne State || Unknown • Unknown, Michigan || 7–2 || 36–6 || 10–1
|- align="center" bgcolor="#ccffcc"
| 43 || May 10 || vs Wayne State || Unknown • Unknown, Michigan || 13–4 || 37–6 || 10–1
|- align="center" bgcolor="#ccffcc"
| 44 || May 11 || vs Eastern Michigan || Unknown • Unknown, Michigan || 10–6 || 38–6 || 10–1
|- align="center" bgcolor="#ccffcc"
| 45 || May 11 || vs Eastern Michigan || Unknown • Unknown, Michigan || 14–2 || 39–6 || 10–1
|- align="center" bgcolor="#ffcccc"
| 46 || May 14 ||  || Ray Fisher Stadium • Ann Arbor, Michigan || 2–3 || 39–7 || 10–2
|- align="center" bgcolor="#ccffcc"
| 47 || May 14 || Purdue || Ray Fisher Stadium • Ann Arbor, Michigan || 11–6 || 40–7 || 11–2
|- align="center" bgcolor="#ccffcc"
| 48 || May 15 || Purdue || Ray Fisher Stadium • Ann Arbor, Michigan || 2–0 || 41–7 || 12–2
|- align="center" bgcolor="#ccffcc"
| 49 || May 15 || Purdue || Ray Fisher Stadium • Ann Arbor, Michigan || 5–4 || 42–7 || 13–2
|-

|-
|-
! style="" | Postseason
|- valign="top"

|- align="center" bgcolor="#ccffcc"
| 50 || May 20 ||  || Ray Fisher Stadium • Ann Arbor, Michigan || 1–0 || 43–7 || 13–2
|- align="center" bgcolor="#ccffcc"
| 51 || May 21 ||  || Ray Fisher Stadium • Ann Arbor, Michigan || 10–9 || 44–7 || 13–3
|- align="center" bgcolor="#ccffcc"
| 52 || May 22 || Iowa || Ray Fisher Stadium • Ann Arbor, Michigan || 12–3 || 45–7 || 13–3
|-

|- align="center" bgcolor="#ccffcc"
| 53 || May 27 ||  || Ray Fisher Stadium • Ann Arbor, Michigan || 4–3 || 46–7 || 13–3
|- align="center" bgcolor="#ccffcc"
| 54 || May 28 || Miami (OH) || Ray Fisher Stadium • Ann Arbor, Michigan || 6–4 || 47–7 || 13–3
|- align="center" bgcolor="#ccffcc"
| 55 || May 29 || Morehead State || Ray Fisher Stadium • Ann Arbor, Michigan || 10–1 || 48–7 || 13–3
|-

|- align="center" bgcolor="#ccffcc"
| 56 || June 4 || vs  || Johnny Rosenblatt Stadium • Omaha, Nebraska || 6–5 || 49–7 || 13–3
|- align="center" bgcolor="#ffcccc"
| 57 || June 7 || vs Alabama || Johnny Rosenblatt Stadium • Omaha, Nebraska || 5–6 || 49–8 || 13–3
|- align="center" bgcolor="#ccffcc"
| 58 || June 8 || vs Stanford || Johnny Rosenblatt Stadium • Omaha, Nebraska || 11–4 || 50–8 || 13–3
|- align="center" bgcolor="#ffcccc"
| 59 || June 10 || vs Texas || Johnny Rosenblatt Stadium • Omaha, Nebraska || 2–4 || 50–9 || 13–3
|-

Awards and honors 
Rich Bair
 First Team All-Big Ten

Fred Erdmann
 First Team All-Big Ten
 Big Ten Batting Champion

Barry Larkin
 Baseball America First Team All-Freshman

Chris Sabo
 Baseball America First Team All-American
 Sporting News First Team All-American
 College World Series All-Tournament Team

Dale Sklar
 College World Series All-Tournament Team

Rich Stoll
 Baseball America Second Team All-American
 American Baseball Coaches Association Second Team All-American
 Big Ten Player of the Year
 First Team All-Big Ten

References 

Michigan Wolverines baseball seasons
Michigan Wolverines baseball
College World Series seasons
Big Ten Conference baseball champion seasons
Michigan